KSSM (103.1 MHz, "103.1 Kiss-FM") is a commercial FM radio station licensed to Copperas Cove, Texas, and serving the Killeen-Texas radio market. The station is owned and operated by Townsquare Media and airs an urban adult contemporary radio format.  The station's studios are located in Temple, and its transmitter is located southwest of Copperas Cove.

History

KOOV
KOOV went on the air in early November 1977 following the frequency's allocation to the area in the mid-1970s. The station was owned by local businessman Ted Connell and radio personality Gaylon Christie. Christie was a local musician in Central Texas and was well known from his days at KTON-AM/FM in Belton, where he was general manager. Initially broadcasting from a studio in the Cove State Bank Building on Main Street in Copperas Cove, KOOV was known as "Cove Radio", billing itself as the "only station that really cares about Copperas Cove". Within a few years, the station developed more of a regional appeal, serving the Killeen/Fort Hood area.

For much of its early years, KOOV was programmed with a personality-driven country music format. Sales were good, and the station managed good ratings with a very high spot load. KOOV was a local full service station with news, weather, local sports, many local "remotes", and a tightly controlled playlist of country music hits of the day.

KOOV was always challenged by a poor signal in the hills of Central Texas because of its Class A status due to other nearby stations on the same or nearby frequencies. The original power was 3,000 watts, but lowered to 980 watts as the station's antenna was raised from 300 feet to 500 feet atop Hogg Mountain. In the early 1990s, the station finally was upgraded to Class C3, increasing its effective radiated power to 8,600 watts from a new self-supporting tower on the far west side of Copperas Cove near the Lampasas/Coryell County line. The upgrade gave KOOV solid signal over the fast-growing region from Lampasas on the west to Temple on the east.

In July 1978, local Copperas Cove High School student Mike Clay joined KOOV as a weekend DJ. Clay continued with KOOV through 1986 as a midday DJ and the station's engineer. Clay also called Copperas Cove Bulldog football with Joe Lombardi for many years. Clay left KOOV in 1986 to become the weekday weathercaster on KCEN-TV channel 6 in Temple, though he continued to provide weather reports on KOOV through 2000. Clay is currently the chief meteorologist for Bay News 9 in Tampa Bay.

KOOV continued to be a highly rated local station through most of the 1990s, but as the decade moved along, its ratings began to fall. Waco country station WACO-FM 99.9 moved its tower to Moody, increasing its signal in the Copperas Cove area and posing a formidable threat. By the end of the decade, WACO had greatly cut into KOOV's ratings.

KSSM
In 2000, Cumulus Media purchased KOOV and sister station KOOC in Belton. Most of the staff was released, new programmers were brought in, and the station was relaunched as adult R&B station KSSM "Kiss 103". Cumulus subsequently sold KSSM and its sister stations to Townsquare Media in July 2012.
The sole Urban station for years serving the market was KIIZ-FM until 2000 when KSSM launched its current format as an Urban AC station. KSSM carried the syndicated Tom Joyner Morning Show in the morning drive time until summer 2018, when his show was replaced by The Steve Harvey Morning Show.  It also carries Michael Baisden in the afternoon and the Keith Sweat Hotel.

External links
KSSM official website

Urban adult contemporary radio stations in the United States
SSM
Townsquare Media radio stations
Radio stations established in 1977
1977 establishments in Texas